Sonu Walia (born 19 February 1964) is a Bollywood actress, winner of Miss India pageant and model. Her birth name is Sanjeet Kaur Walia. In 1989, she earned a Filmfare Best Supporting Actress award for her performance in film Khoon Bhari Maang (1988). A psychology graduate and a student of journalism, Walia took up modelling before she entered the Miss India contest.

Career
Walia won the Miss India contest in 1985 and went to compete in Miss Universe 1985. She took over from Juhi Chawla, Miss India 1984 and, after completing her responsibilities, relinquished her crown to Mehr Jesia in 1986.

In 1988, she acted in the film Akarshan. That year, she appeared in and won the Filmfare Best Supporting Actress Award for Khoon Bhari Maang, which also starred Rekha and Kabir Bedi.

From 1988, she played the role of Maharani Chitrangadhaa, mother of Babruvahana, in Mahabharat Katha TV show. She acted in a TV serial called Betaal Pachisi with Tom Alter and Shahbaz Khan.

Personal life
Walia was married to Surya Pratap Singh, an NRI based in the US who was a hotelier and Indian film producer. He died in 2009.

Filmography

References

External links

 

1964 births
Femina Miss India winners
Female models from Delhi
Indian film actresses
Living people
Miss Universe 1985 contestants
People from New Delhi
Punjabi people
Ahluwalia
Filmfare Awards winners